KKVR (106.1 FM, "The River") is a radio station broadcasting an oldies format. Licensed to Kerrville, Texas, the station is owned by Lyndell Grubbs, through licensee Radio Ranch, LLC.

References

External links
Radio Ranch Group Website

KVR
Oldies radio stations in the United States